Sirks leads here. For places and people named Sirk, see Sirk (disambiguation)
Adriaan Johan Boudewijn Sirks (born 14 September 1947), known as Boudewijn Sirks and as A. J. B. Sirks, is a Dutch academic lawyer and legal historian specializing in Roman law. He was Regius Professor of Civil Law at the University of Oxford from 2006 to 2014.

Early life
Sirks was born in The Hague, Netherlands. He studied law at the University of Leiden, graduating with a Master of Laws (LLM) degree in 1972. He then studied theology and philosophy at the University of Amsterdam, where he later graduated with as Doctor of Law in 1984. In 2014 he was appointed Knight in the Order of the Netherlands Lion (RNL) and in 2021 he became Doctor of Civil Law (Oxon.).

Career
Sirks's first academic position was as research assistant in philosophy of culture and esthetics at Amsterdam in 1975. In 1978 he was appointed Lecturer in Legal History at the University of Utrecht, where he was later promoted Senior Lecturer in Legal Techniques. At the same time, he was writing a thesis for a doctoral degree in law at the University of Amsterdam. He returned to Amsterdam in 1989 as Reader and acting Professor of Legal Techniques.

In 1997, Sirks became Professor of Legal History and (German) Civil Law (the chair of the late Helmut Coing), later renamed into History of Ancient Law, History of European Private Law, and (German) Civil Law, at the Johann-Wolfgang-Goethe University of Frankfurt am Main. In 2002 he was elected correspondent of the Royal Netherlands Academy of Arts and Sciences.

In December 2005, HM The Queen appointed him as the Regius Professor of Civil Law in the University of Oxford, with effect from 1 February 2006, in succession to the late Professor Peter Birks. At the same time he was elected a Fellow of All Souls College, Oxford. He retired from the chair in 2014, but is still Fellow of All Souls College.

Sirks has also been a visiting scholar at Columbia University, New York, Visiting Professor at the University of Kansas, and Visiting Professor at the Pontifica Universidad Católica de Santiago de Chile. In 2018/2019 and in 2022 he taught at the University of Bonn. He is an Editor of the Tijdschrift voor Rechtsgeschiedenis/Legal History Review. He is further a Member of the Direttivo of the Associazione Storico-Giuridico Costantiniana.

Published work
Professor Sirks's research interests span civil law, European private law, Roman law and papyrology. He has published work on a variety of subjects related to law, papyrology, and the ancient world, including archaic Roman law, matters of classical private law, the administrative and public law of the later Roman Empire and the reception of Roman law in Europe and in the former Dutch East Indies. He is co-author of the standard edition of the Pommersfelden Papyri. The Theodosian Code and the colonate in the Roman empire are particularly subjects of research.

His Food for Rome: the Legal Structure of the Transportation and Processing of Supplies for the Imperial Distributions in Rome and Constantinople (1991) developed from the thesis for his doctoral degree at Amsterdam, completed in 1984. Following the death of the Dutch papyrologist Pieter Johannes Sijpesteijn in 1996, Sirks edited with K. A. Worp a collection of previously unpublished papyri dedicated to Sijpesteijn's memory by his fellow papyrologists, including papyri from the Hellenistic, Roman and Byzantine periods, to reflect Sijpesteijn's wide interests.

Selected publications
 H. M. A. Jansen, Johannes B. Opschoor, Adriaan Johan Boudewijn Sirks, Verkeerslawaai in Nederland (Coutinho, January 1977) 
 A. J. B. Sirks, Sulpicius Severus' Letter to Salvius in Bolletino dell'Istituto di Diritto romano 85 (1982) pp. 143–170
 A. J. B. Sirks, Food for Rome: the Legal Structure of the Transportation and Processing of Supplies for the Imperial Distributions in Rome and Constantinople (Amsterdam, Gieben, 1991)  
 A. J. B. Sirks, Summaria antiqua Codicis Theodosiani, new edition, with the notes published in P. Krüger, Codicis Theodosiani fragmenta Taurinensia (A. J. B. Sirks, Amsterdam, 1996, XII + 130 pp)
 Boudewijn Sirks, The editing and compilation of the Code in I. Wood, Jill Harries, The Theodosian Code: Studies in the Imperial Law of Late Antiquity (1996)
 A. J. Boudewijn Sirks, Shifting Frontiers in the Law: Romans, Provincials, and Barbarians, in Ralph Mathisen and Hagith Sivan, eds., Shifting Frontiers in Late Antiquity (Aldershot, 1996)
 A. J. B. Sirks, P. J. Sijpesteijn, K. A. Worp (eds), Ein frühbyzantinisches Szenario für die Amtswechslung in der Sitonie: die griechischen Papyri aus Pommersfelden (PPG) mit einem Anhang über die Pommersfeldener Digestenfragmente und die Überlieferungsgeschichte der Digesten (Munich, Beck, 1996)
 A. J. B. Sirks, The Epistula ad Salvium, appended to a letter of Sulpicius Severus to Paulinus: Observations on a recent analysis by C. Lepelley, in Subseciva Groningana Vol. VI (1999) 75
 A. J. B. Sirks, Saving Souls through Adoption: Legal Adaptation in the Dutch East Indies in John W. Cairns, O. F. Robinson, Critical Studies in Ancient Law, Comparative Law and Legal History (Hart Publishing, 2001) pp 365–379, 
 A. J. B. Sirks, Sailing in the Off-Season with Reduced Financial Risk and Some Reflections in J.-J. Aubert, A. J. B. Sirks (eds), Speculum Iuris, Roman Law as a Reflection of Social and Economic Life in Antiquity (The University of Michigan Press, Ann Arbor, 2002)
 A. J. B. Sirks, Die Nomination für die städtischen Ämter im römischen Reich, in A. Cordes, J. Rückert, R. Schulze (eds), Stadt - Gemeinde - Genossenschaft: Festschrift für Gerhard Dilcher zum 70. Geburtstag (Erich Schmidt Verlag, 2003) 
 A.J.B. Sirks and K. A. Worp (eds), Papyri in Memory of P J Sijpesteijn (Oakville CT, American Studies in Papyrology 40, American Society for Papyrologists, 2004)  
 A. J. B. Sirks, Der Zweck des Senatus Consultum Claudianum von 52 n. Chr. (2005) in 122 Zeitschrift der Savigny-Stiftung fur Rechtsgeschichte, Romanistische Abteilung, pp. 138–149,  
 A. J. B. Sirks, Het “Rapport van L. Taillefert en W.A. Alting betreffende het Alphabetisch Receuil van J.J. Craan” (der statutaire wetten en reglementen &.a van Nederlandsch Oost-Indië) van 29 augustus 1765, met bijlagen en met het Alphabetisch Receuil op CD-Rom, uitgegeven door A.J.B. Sirks, [Werken der Stichting tot Uitgaaf der Bronnen van het Oud-Vaderlandse Recht no. 31], ’s-Gravenhage 2005. 
 A. J. B. Sirks, Van Bijnkershoeks Observationes (2018-2913), in het Nederlands samengevat door B.M. Telders, K.N. Korteweg, W.L. van Spengler, F.J. de Jong, G.J. ter Kuile en W. van Iterson, met aanvulling van de ontbrekende samenvattingen door A.J.B. Sirks, uitgegeven door A.J.B. Sirks, [Werken der Stichting tot Uitgaaf der Bronnen van het Oud-Vaderlandse Recht no. 30], ’s-Gravenhage 2005, [] 
 A. J. B. Sirks, C. van Bijnkershoek, W. Pauw, Index in observationes tumultuarias , uitgegeven door A.J.B. Sirks, [Werken der Stichting tot Uitgaaf der Bronnen van het Oud-Vaderlandse Recht no. 34], ’s-Gravenhage 2005, 
 Boudewijn Sirks, The food distributions in Rome and Constantinople: Imperial power and continuity in Kolb, Anne, Herrschaftsstrukturen und Herrschaftspraxis: Konzepte, Prinzipien und Strategien der Administration im römischen Kaiserreich (Akademie Verlag, 2006)  
 A. J. B. Sirks, The Theodosian Code, a Study (Editions du Quatorze Septembre, 2007) 
 Grundzüge der europäischen Privatrechtsgeschichte. Einführung und Sachenrecht,  door W.J. Zwalve, A.J.B. Sirks, Wien/Köln 2012 p. 
 A. J. B. Sirks, Common right and reason’ against Parliament and King, in Divus Thomas 123 (2020) 167–183.
 A. J. B. Sirks,  the published Theodosian Code include obsolete constitutions?, Tijdschrift voor Rechtsgeschiedenis 89 (2021), 70–92.
 A. J. B. Sirks,  after the division of administration in 364 an emperor issue a law for the entire empire?, in: ZSS Rom Abt 138 (2021), 555–567.
 A. J. B. Sirks, The imperial policy against heretics of restricting succession in the fourth century AD, with an appendix on the Theodosian Code, Tijdschrift voor REchtsgeschiedenis 89 (2021), 536–577.
 A. J. B. Sirks, The colonate in the Later Roman empire, Tijdschrift boor REchtsgeschiedenis 90 (2022), 129–147.
 A. J. B. Sirks,  Farming as a Financial Enterprise in the Late Roman Republic and the Question of the Partes, in ‘Law and Economic Performance in the Roman World’, ed. K. Verboven, P. Erdkamp, Leiden 2022, 117–130.

Notes

References

1947 births
Living people
Dutch legal scholars
Leiden University alumni
University of Amsterdam alumni
Fellows of All Souls College, Oxford
Academic staff of Goethe University Frankfurt
Writers from The Hague
Regius Professors of Civil Law (University of Oxford)
Members of the Royal Netherlands Academy of Arts and Sciences